The Millionaire is a 1931 all-talking pre-Code comedy film produced and distributed by Warner Bros. and starring George Arliss in the title role. The film is a remake of the 1922 film titled The Ruling Passion, which also starred Arliss. The film was based on the short story "Idle Hands" by Earl Derr Biggers. In one of his early film roles, James Cagney had a brief but key appearance as a life insurance salesman. The supporting cast features Florence Arliss, David Manners, Evalyn Knapp, Noah Beery Sr., Cagney, J. Farrell MacDonald, Charley Grapewin and Tully Marshall.

Plot
Wealthy car manufacturer James Alden (George Arliss) is forced to retire by his physician, Dr. Harvey (J.C. Nugent). However, idleness soon bores him. He takes the advice of brash life insurance salesman Schofield (James Cagney) and buys half interest in a gas station from Peterson (Noah Beery) without telling his wife Laura (real-life spouse Florence Arliss) or socialite daughter Barbara 'Babs' Alden (Evalyn Knapp). Because he is known nationwide, he uses the alias Charles Miller.

He and new partner William 'Bill' Merrick (David Manners) quickly discover that they have been swindled. A new highway opens the next day, and Peterson's new gas station takes nearly all their business away. Refusing to give up, James convinces Bill to borrow $1,000 from his aunt to build a new gas station right across the street from Peterson's. Bill is an architect, so he does the design work. With James' business sense, they thrive, while Peterson languishes.

One day, Babs stops at the station for gas. Bill recognizes her (they met once at a dance at the University of Michigan) and starts a conversation. Soon, Babs is a frequent customer. James is secretly pleased because he disapproved of the rich idler she had been dating, Carter Andrews (Bramwell Fletcher), but publicly he discourages his daughter from seeing someone not of their lofty social rank.

In the end, Peterson buys James and Bill out (at a substantial profit to them). Bill finally works up the courage to speak to Babs' father about marrying her and is stunned to learn his future in-law's identity.

Cast

Box office
According to Warner Bros records, the film earned $542,000 domestically and $293,000 foreign.

Preservation status
A print is preserved in the Library of Congress collection.

References

External links
 
 
 
  1893-1993

Warner Bros. films
1931 comedy films
1931 films
American black-and-white films
Films directed by John G. Adolfi
Booth Tarkington
American comedy films
1930s American films